Brian Maxwell (born 13 January 1986) is a Canadian recurve archer. He won gold at the 2019 Pan American Games in Lima as part of the team competition alongside teammates Crispin Duenas and Eric Peters.

References

1986 births
Living people
Canadian male archers
Sportspeople from Abbotsford, British Columbia
Pan American Games gold medalists for Canada
Pan American Games medalists in archery
Archers at the 2019 Pan American Games
Medalists at the 2019 Pan American Games
20th-century Canadian people
21st-century Canadian people